Donnell Michael Ryan  is a barrister, solicitor and former Judge of the Federal Court of Australia.  He served on the Federal Court of Australia from 29 September 1986 until 2 June 2011. He is currently a member of the Victorian Bar.

Early life 
Ryan was educated at Dandenong High School, Melbourne, and graduated from the University of Melbourne with an honours degree in law and an arts degree.

Ryan is married to Gabrielle, and has one son and one daughter.

Career 
Ryan entered the Victorian Bar as a barrister and solicitor on 1 April 1965, where he worked in general practice as a Junior Counsel. He practised industrial, commercial, constitutional and administrative law. From 1965 to 1969 Ryan was a teaching fellow in law at Monash University, and from 1966 to 1971 was tutor at the College of Legal Education.

In 1980 Ryan took his silk to become Queen Counsel in Victoria, and was admitted to New South Wales in 1982. He joined the Federal Court of Australia in 1986.  He appeared in the NSW Supreme Court, Victoria Supreme Court, Supreme Court of the Australian Capital Territory, High Court, the Industrial Relations Court of Australia, the Conciliation and Arbitration Commission, the NSW Industrial Commission and specialist tribunals. Ryan served as acting Chairman at the Victorian Liquor Control Commission and Senior Counsel assisting the Hope Royal Commission into Australia's Security Organisations. From 1984 to 1990  Ryan was part-time commissioner on the Australian Law Reform Commission. Ryan was involved in drafting the Admiralty Act 1988.

Ryan retired from the being a judge in 2011 and took up the office of Independent Assessor, Special Building Industry Powers. In 2014–2015, Ryan conducted an Independent Review of the “Melbourne Response” to allegations of sexual abuse within the Catholic Archdiocese of Melbourne.

References

Judges of the Federal Court of Australia
Living people
Australian King's Counsel
Australian Senior Counsel
People from Melbourne
Judges of the Industrial Relations Court of Australia
20th-century Australian judges
21st-century Australian judges
Year of birth missing (living people)